Local elections were held in Moldova on June 3, 2007, with a runoff for mayors on June 17, 2007.

Voter turnout reached 52.34% nationwide and 37.17% in Chişinău municipality. Following the elections, district, municipal, town and village councils were elected, as well as 420 mayors.

Dorin Chirtoacă became mayor of Chişinău.

References 

 

2007 in Moldova
Local elections in Moldova
2007 elections in Moldova